Marguerite Viby (25 June 1909 – 8 April 2001) was a Danish actress of stage, film and television. Considered one of the great comedy actresses of Danish cinema, Viby received honorary Bodil and Robert Awards in 2000 for lifetime achievement. She appeared in more than 50 films and television shows during a career that spanned from the silent film era in 1929 until a television series in 1983.

Career
Marguerite Viby was born Ida Marguerite Steenberg Jensen Viby in Copenhagen, Denmark on 25 June 1909, the daughter of a policeman and a secretary. Her father died when she was 16 and her mother a year later. Viby left school at 14, and worked part-time to pay for dance lessons. She was schooled as a dancer at Emilie Walbom's Ballet School as'a well as through private instruction from the Danish Royal Dancer John Andersen. In 1923, when she was 14 years old, Viby debuted in a summer revue at Tivoli Gardens. She continued to perform in revues and stage musicals throughout her life.

In 1929, Viby began her film career in the silent film Højt på en kvist (High on in the Attic). She followed with four Fy og Bi comedies film in which her casting was mostly based on her physical attraction, however in He, She and Hamlet, the first Danish combined sound film, she danced and sang a romantic duet with leading man Hans W. Petersen.

According to Danish film historian Morten Piil, it was Viby's next role which established her most noted persona—the energetic, witty woman who acts as she necessary to maneuver in a man's world. In the 1932 George Schnéevoigt film Tretten År (13 Years), Viby was an office girl who plays a thirteen-year-old Lolita to avoid men's advances. Piil wrote that it was only Viby's "fundamental cheerful innocence which saved this erotic farce..."

Viby made her next nine films under the direction of her second husband, Emanuel Gregers. This included four films after they divorced in 1938, and she had married the actor Knud Wold. Her greatest success during this period was Mille, Marie og Mig (Mille, Marie and Me) in which Viby played a woman with three personalities—the prim, bespectacled student Klaus; the erotic nightclub singer Mille; and the homebody Marie. As Mille, in Marlene Dietrich-style men's clothing, Viby sings the popular Danish hit Jeg har elsket dig så længe jeg kan mindes (I have Loved You as Long as I Can Remember).

In the early 1940s, Viby made two popular comedies with the directing duo of Alice O'Fredericks and Lau Lauritzen Jr. -- Frøken Kirkemus (Mrs. Churchmouse) and Frøken Vildkat (Mrs. Wildcat). The style of direction—quick light-hearted banter similar to American screw-ball comedies—was better suited to Viby than the heavier exposition of Gregers direction. She quickly became one of the most popular actresses and performed in a string of romantic comedies including Som du vil ha' mig-! (However You Will Have Me-!)(1943), Jeg elsker en anden (I Love Someone Else) (1946), and Den Store Gavtyv (1956).

During the period 1938-1956 she made over a dozen films in Sweden, including Swedish versions of some of her major Danish film successes. Also three films she first made in Swedish were made in Danish versions, Fröken Kyrkråtta (Mrs. Churchmouse (1941), Fröken Vildkatt (Mrs. Wildcat (1942) and Lyckan kommer (Happiness Comes (1942).

In the 1970s and 80's, Viby continued her acting in television, including the continuing role of Olga Mortensen in the comedy series En Stor Familie (One Big Family). In 2000, Viby was presented with lifetime achievement awards at both the Bodil and Robert awards ceremonies. Viby died the following year on 8 April 2001 at the age of 91.

Personal life
While her professional acting life was steady, her personal life was more volatile. Viby married five times. Her first marriage was to actor and dancer Poul Christian Guldager (1926–1931), then to Danish film director Emanuel Gregers (1932–1938). In 1938, Viby married businessman Knud Wold with whom she had her only child, the actress Susse Wold. During the early 1940s, Viby was linked with Prince Bertil of Sweden. In 1953, she married actor Preben Mahrt, and after they divorced, she was married to schoolteacher Erik Henry Tangfelt from 1967 until his sudden death at 48 in 1971.

Filmography

Højt paa en kvist - (1929)
Pas paa pigerne (1930)
Hr. Tell og søn (1930)
Ve' den, der lyver (1930) ... aka Woe to Him who Lies
Krudt med knald (1931)
Han, hun og Hamlet - (1932) ... aka He, She and Hamlet
Skal vi vædde en million? - 1932 ... aka Do You want to bet a  Million?
Tretten år - 1932
Fem raske piger - 1933
Så til søs - 1933
Skaf en sensation - 1934
Min kone er husar - 1935
Cocktail - 1937
Mille, Marie og mig - 1937
Komtessen på Stenholt - 1939
En pige med pep - 1940
Sørensen og Rasmussen - 1940
Frøken Kirkemus - 1941
Lykken kommer - 1942
Frøken Vildkat - 1942
Op med humøret - 1943
Som du vil ha' mig - 1943
Dolly Takes a Chance - 1944
Teatertosset - 1944
Lilla helgonet - 1944Jeg elsker en anden - 1946
 Peggy on a Spree - 1946
 I Love You Karlsson (1947)Den opvakte jomfru - 1950Den store gavtyv - 1956Hvad vil De ha'? - 1956
 A Little Nest (1956)Pigen og vandpytten - 1958Mine tossede drenge - 1961Don Olsen kommer til byen - 1964Far laver sovsen - 1967Mordskab - (1969) ... aka The BusybodyPå'en igen Amalie - 1973

Awards
Johanne Luise Heiberg Memorial Grant
Liva Weel Anniversary Grant
Ole Haslund Artists Fund (1969)
Frederiksberg Artist of the Year (1983)
Clara Pontoppidans Fødseldaglegat (1987)
Karl Gerhardts Hæderpris (1987)
Bodil Award (2000)
Robert Award (2000)

References

Further reading
Mørk, Ebbe,  Marguerite Viby - det var sjovt at være til (2001)
Pils, Morten, Marguerite Viby, Danske filmskuespillere, Gyldendal (2003):
Spies, Margrethe Linder, Marguerite Viby: skuespillerindens karrière i tekst og billeder'' (1940)
Marguerite Viby Død, Obituary, BT Newspaper, (8 April 2001), retrieved 2008-06-13

External links
 

1909 births
2001 deaths
Danish film actresses
Danish stage actresses
Danish silent film actresses
20th-century Danish actresses
Bodil Honorary Award recipients